Gadilgaon is a village in Parner taluka in Ahmednagar district of state of Maharashtra, India.

Religion
The majority of the population in the village is Hindu.

Temples

The following are some notable temples in Gadilgaon:

 Vetal Baba Mandir
 Mahadev Mandir
 Sant Savtamali Mandir
 Hanuman Mandir

Education
ZP's Primary School up to 4th standard.

Schools
 Jilha Parishad Prathamik Shala, Gadilgaon.

Economy
The majority of the population has farming as their primary occupation.

Agriculture

Farming is the main source of income. Some of the main crops produced include the following:
 Bajara
 Wheat
 Onion
 Sugarcane

See also
 Parner taluka
 Villages in Parner taluka

References 

Villages in Parner taluka
Villages in Ahmednagar district